Voluntary may refer to:

 Voluntary (music)
 Voluntary or volunteer, person participating via volunteering/volunteerism
 Voluntary muscle contraction

See also 
 Voluntary action 
 Voluntariness, in law and philosophy
 Voluntaryism, rejection of coercion
 Voluntarism (disambiguation)